Blackmailer (Czech: Vyděrač) is a 1937 Czech drama film directed by Ladislav Brom. The film sets were designed by the art director Jan Zázvorka.

Cast
 Vítězslav Boček as Accountant Josef Bašek
 Adina Mandlová as Shoe saleswoman Máša Lírová
 Bedřich Vrbský as Industrialist Emil Frýbl
 Helena Bušová as Olga Frýblová  
 Jiří Plachý as Alfréd Merhaut 
 Rudolf Deyl as President of the syndicate
 Jan S. Kolár as Director of the syndicate
 František Kreuzmann as Lawyer Piroh
 Gustav Hilmar as Accountant Dufek
 Ladislav Pešek as Medicine student Petr Hureš

References

External links
 

1937 films
1937 drama films
1930s Czech-language films
Czech drama films
Czechoslovak drama films
Czechoslovak black-and-white films
1930s Czech films